Wayne Hotel, formerly known as The Waynewood, is a historic hotel located at Wayne, Delaware County, Pennsylvania. It was built in 1906, and is a five-story, Tudor Revival building, with a two-story rear extension.  It is built of brick and stucco with false Half Timbering.  It features a one-story, wraparound porch with a semi-circular dining projection and two projecting bay windows extending from the second to fourth floors.

Local entrepreneur Stephen W. Bajus purchased the property in the 1980s and, after a complete refurbishment, the hotel offers all the usual modern amenities, including a restaurant, a private room for dining and meetings, 40 guest rooms plus two luxury suites and 14 off-site luxury furnished apartments for longer term stays.

It was added to the National Register of Historic Places in 1987.

References

External links
Wayne Hotel website
Rosalie Restaurant

Hotel buildings on the National Register of Historic Places in Pennsylvania
Tudor Revival architecture in Pennsylvania
Hotel buildings completed in 1906
Buildings and structures in Delaware County, Pennsylvania
National Register of Historic Places in Delaware County, Pennsylvania
1906 establishments in Pennsylvania